Ryan Mullaney (born 1996) hurler who plays for Laois Senior Championship club Castletown and at inter-county level with the Laois senior hurling team. He usually lines out as a centre-back.

Honours

Laois
Joe McDonagh Cup (1): 2019

References

External links
Ryan Mullaney profile at the Laois GAA website

1995 births
Living people
CIT hurlers
Castletown hurlers
Laois inter-county hurlers
Hurling backs